The following article presents a summary of the 1950 football (soccer) season in Brazil, which was the 49th season of competitive football in the country.

Torneio Rio-São Paulo

Final Standings

Corinthians declared as the Torneio Rio-São Paulo champions.

Campeonato Paulista

Final Standings

Palmeiras declared as the Campeonato Paulista champions.

State championship champions

Other competition champions

Brazil national team
The following table lists all the games played by the Brazil national football team in official competitions and friendly matches during 1950.

References

 Brazilian competitions at RSSSF
 1950 Brazil national team matches at RSSSF

 
Seasons in Brazilian football
Brazil